Omloop van de Vlasstreek was a Belgian post-WW II cycling race organized for the last time in 1994.

Heule, a small village in the Kortrijk region in West-Flanders, was both start and finish place.

In the first years, it was known as the G.P of Heule.

The competition's roll of honor includes the successes of Briek Schotte and Willy Teirlinck.

Winners

References 

Cycle races in Belgium
1945 establishments in Belgium
Defunct cycling races in Belgium
Recurring sporting events established in 1945
Recurring sporting events disestablished in 1994
1994 disestablishments in Belgium